Time in Connecticut, as in all US states, is regulated by the United States Department of Transportation. Connecticut is in the Eastern Time Zone (ET) and observes daylight saving time (DST).

Independent of daylight saving time, solar noon in Connecticut on the March equinox is approximately 11:54 in the northeast corner and 12:02 in the southwest corner. New England, which includes Connecticut, is one of the few areas in the United States where solar noon is before noon. Connecticut legislation as recently as January 2019 has been proposed that could ultimately lead to a change in the state's time zone and possibly New England's as well, moving to the Atlantic Time Zone, if Massachusetts and Rhode Island do the same.

IANA time zone database
The IANA time zone database identifier for Connecticut is America/New_York.

See also
Time in New England states: Connecticut, Maine, Massachusetts, New Hampshire, Rhode Island, Vermont

References

Connecticut
Geography of Connecticut